Coupar may refer to

 Coupar Angus, a town in Perth and Kinross, Scotland
 Coupar Angus Abbey
 Abbot of Coupar Angus, the one-time head of the monastic community and lands of Coupar Angus Abbey
 Coupar Angus F.C., a Scottish Junior football club
 Lord Coupar, a title associated with another title, Lord Balmerino

People

 Paddy Coupar, a Scottish rugby league player
 Thomas Coupar, a Scottish football player born in 1862
 Jimmy Coupar, a Scottish football player born in 1869
 Peter Coupar, a Scottish football player born in 1866